Group B of the 2022 FIBA Women's Basketball World Cup took place from 22 to 27 September 2022. The group consisted of Australia, Canada, France, Japan, Mali, and Serbia.

The top four teams advanced to the quarterfinals.

Teams
Mali replaced Nigeria, who withdrew.

Standings

Games
All times are local (UTC+10).

Canada vs Serbia

Japan vs Mali

Australia vs France

Serbia vs Japan

France vs Canada

Mali vs Australia

Mali vs France

Australia vs Serbia

Japan vs Canada

Serbia vs Mali

France vs Japan

Canada vs Australia

Mali vs Canada

Serbia vs France

Australia vs Japan

References

Group B